"L'Enfance d'une ville" (from the series Villes nouvelles, episode 1) is a 1975 TV documentary by French filmmaker Éric Rohmer about the planning of the new city of Cergy-Pontoise, which was under construction at the time.

Films directed by Éric Rohmer
French documentary films
1970s French films